Colmenar may refer to:

Spain
Colmenar, Málaga, a municipality in the province of Málaga, Andalusia.
Colmenar Viejo, a municipality in the Community of Madrid.
Colmenar del Arroyo, a municipality in the Community of Madrid.
Colmenar de Oreja, a municipality in the Community of Madrid.
Colmenar de Montemayor, a municipality in the province of Salamanca, Castile and León.
AD Colmenar Viejo, a Spanish football team from Colmenar Viejo, in the Community of Madrid.
CD Colmenar de Oreja, a Spanish football team from Colmenar de Oreja, in the Community of Madrid.